Maura Hopkins (born 3 May 1984) is an Irish former Fine Gael politician who served as a Senator for the Administrative Panel from 2016 to 2020. She had been a member of Roscommon County Council from 2014 to 2016.

She was an unsuccessful candidate at the 2016 general election for the Roscommon–Galway constituency.

She was the Fine Gael Seanad spokesperson on Arts, Heritage and Regional, Rural and Gaeltacht Development. She was initially chosen as the Fine Gael candidate for Roscommon–Galway at the 2020 general election, but withdrew due to family commitments. She did not contest the 2020 Seanad election.

References

1984 births
Living people
Members of the 25th Seanad
21st-century women members of Seanad Éireann
Fine Gael senators
People from County Roscommon
Local councillors in County Roscommon
Alumni of the University of Galway